{{Speciesbox
| taxon = Phytoecia vittata| authority = (Péringuey, 1888)
| synonyms = * Nitocris vittata Péringuey, 1888
}}Phytoecia vittata'' is a species of beetle in the family Cerambycidae. It was described by Péringuey in 1888.

References

Phytoecia
Beetles described in 1888